Franziska Traub (born 3 August 1962 in Stuttgart, Germany) is a German actress.

Life 
Traub works as an actress for German television. In Germany she best known for her role of Gisi Wiemers in the television comedy Ritas Welt.

Filmography 

 1993: Nachtschwester Kroymann
 1988: Die zweite Heimat
 1995: Bohai, Bohau
 1998–2003: Ritas Welt
 2000: Just the Beginning
 2001: Hausmeister Krause – Ordnung muss sein
 2003: Der kleine Mönch – Die dicke Nonne
 2008: Das Perfekte Promi Dinner
 2009: Pfarrer Braun
 2009: All You Need Is Love – Meine Schwiegertochter ist ein Mann (TV-comedy)
 2010–2011: Hand aufs Herz 
 2011: Doctor's Diary (two episodes)
 2011: 
 2011: Anna und die Liebe (one episode)
 2015: Schmidts Katze
 2016: Bittersweet (Bittersüss)

Theatre 

 Junges Theater Göttingen (1987–1989)
 Pomp, Duck and Circumstances (1990–1996)
 Chamäleon, Bar jeder Vernunft (1997–1999)
 Palazzo Colombino (1998–1999)
 Palazzo Witzigmann (2001–2002)

Awards 

 2010 and 2011: German Comedy Awards for role in Ritas Welt

External links 
 Official website by Franziska Traub
 Berliner Zeitung:Franzsika Traub  (german)

References 

German television actresses
Living people
1962 births